The Portland Loo is a type of single-occupancy public toilet designed by the city of Portland, Oregon. It is manufactured, sold, and marketed by the Portland-based manufacturer Madden Fabrication under license from the city, for $96,000 each. The first unit was installed in the Old Town Chinatown neighborhood in Portland in 2008. Since the first unit was installed, additional 54 units have been purchased by February 2018, mostly by 20 other cities and 15 of them within the city of Portland.

In 2014, marketing for the restroom was transferred from the city of Portland to Madden Fabrication.

Design and placement 
The Portland Loo has features such as blue lighting said to make it difficult for intravenous drug users to find a vein for injection. After Portland Loos were installed in Chico, California, the Chico Enterprise-Record editorial board summarized what has worked and what didn't: they credited human attendants as the key to successful locations such as the attended locations in Los Angeles and San Francisco.

Features and specifications 
The toilets can be solar powered.
The interior dimensions are  x , so a user can wheel in a bicycle  or baby-stroller to protect them from theft. One of the prefabricated loos can be installed in as little as two hours if a concrete pad on which to place the loo has been prepared in advance, complete with the utility connections.

Customization and options 
Some installations have been fitted with a "sharps disposal" option for needles, primarily in the area with high transient activity due to the increased drug activity by homeless people. The sharps disposal is a hole above the handrail marked with the biohazard symbol and lettering "Sharps Disposal". In Portland, some units are fitted with sharps disposal receptacle, such as the one at Colonel Summers Park that was placed into service in September 2017  in the Buckman neighborhood and South Park Blocks.

List of locations

Public reception 

In 2011, police officer (and future police union president) Daryl Turner characterized the existing Portland Loo in the Old Town Chinatown neighborhood in Portland described as "Randy Leonard's crack house right there" and "a favorite nighttime destination for drug dealers and prostitutes, who conduct their business behind its closed door." In 2014, National Geographic's documentary Drugs, Inc. Dope-landia featured two female transients occupying the Portland Loo at the same time and smoking methamphetamine at the Southwest Naito Parkway and Southwest Taylor Street location in downtown Portland by the Tom McCall Waterfront Park.

In mid-2016, residents near the San Diego toilet called it "a magnet for crime and homelessness". An editorial intern for the special interest magazine Yes! Magazine called criticism of the Portland Loo a focus point for "systematic denial of humanity to homeless people". San Diego officials documented an increase in police calls after Portland Loo units were installed. The calls are mostly disturbance of peace-type relating to transient people. In July 2015:According to a memo from city Chief Operating Officer Scott Chadwick, police were called to the restroom at 14th and L streets 25 times between April and June, compared to 11 times in the same period last year — before the facility was installed. Calls at the other one climbed from 32 to 58.In 2016, some stakeholders in Seattle's U-District expressed concerns about increase in transient people and drug activity with the proposed installation of a Portland Loo in their neighborhood.

In October 2017, Caddo Parish, Louisiana commission discussed on the proposal for installing a Portland Loo on the courthouse grounds. During the commission discussion, commissioners commented "We don't need to be doing anything to attract people to the courthouse" and "transient people are going to be on the courthouse grounds". The commission voted to move the discussion to long range planning commission.

Some business owners in San Diego expressed concerns about increase in drug and transient activity in general. The city of San Diego decommissioned one of the two Portland Loos installed due to transient activity and crime and put the removed loo up for auction on GovDeals. The city of Albuquerque purchased it for $20,000 in the summer of 2017. KRQE reported in October 2018 that despite having purchased and taken delivery of the Portland Loo, it has yet to be installed. City Councilor Benton's office did not respond to KRQE's request for explanation.

The loo has been praised by a homelessness advocacy group in Washington, D.C. and a columnist for Toronto Star.

Intellectual property 
The Portland Loo is reportedly the "brainchild" of a former Portland commissioner Randy Leonard, who obtained a design patent on the stainless steel design in 2008.

When the city of Portland commissioned the design of the toilet, it retained the intellectual property rights to the design, and would receive a royalty from the manufacturer, for each unit it sold. Press reports described this arrangement as a source of funds, for the city. In August 2013, the municipal corporation city of Portland sued a Roseburg, Oregon manufacturer Romtec that has been manufacturing a similar product for infringement. A settlement was reached to end the infringement lawsuit. The terms allow Romtec to continue to make and sell their Sidewalk Restroom for 25 years, but subject to a royalty payment at the rate of 8% of selling price payable to the city of Portland.

In 2014, a citizen group sued the city, asserting the city had spent over $600,000 to promote the loos, without proper authorization. The city of Portland had exited its role in sales and marketing of the Portland Loo. It has leased the rights to use and market the design to Madden for 25 years in exchange for 8% royalty payment to the city.

In November 2019, KATU News reports Madden said royalty payment of 8% of Loo sales turned over to the city government of Portland has totaled $362,323.61 since 2014.

Society and culture

In popular culture
The loos have been featured in the television show Portlandia, and fans seek them out, for photo-ops, when they visit Portland.

Toilets inspired by the Portland loo

In 2018 Vernon, British Columbia planned to purchase Portland loos, but withdrew after being placed on a waiting list, so had a local firm design a similar system.

See also
Automatic self-clean toilet seat
Unisex public toilet

References

External links

2008 establishments in Oregon
American inventions
Public toilets